SIX5SIX is an Indian textile company based in Gurgaon, India.
The company has two divisions, Six5Six Street (which markets casual wear clothing) and Six5Six Sport (which markets sportswear, currently focused on football products). In recent years, the division has also manufactured cricket, tennis, badminton, running, and cycling products.

Products
The company has two divisions, "SIX5SIX Street" (casual wear) and "SIX5SIX Sport" (sportswear)

Sponsorships 
SIX5SIX produces kit uniforms for the India national football team,  Kerala Blasters FC and NorthEast United in the Indian Super League also RoundGlass Punjab FC, Real Kashmir FC in the I-League. Youth divisions of G.D. Estoril Praia from the Portuguese Primeira Liga, Biratnagar City FC in the newly established Nepal Super League, as well as professional Karnataka side Kickstart FC that competes in the BDFA Super Division. The brand also previously produced kits for dissolved FC Pune City during the 2018-19 ISL season.

SIX5SIX also produces kits for Indian Esports outfit Revenant Esports.

Football

National Teams
  India (2019–present)

Clubs

  FC Pune City (2018–19)
  Kerala Blasters FC (2018–19, 2021–present)
  FC Goa (2020–2021)
  NorthEast United FC (2021–present)
  RoundGlass Punjab FC (2021–22)
  Real Kashmir FC (2021–22)
  FC Bengaluru United (2021–22)
  Kickstart FC (2021–present)
  Sudeva Delhi FC (2021–22)
  Sethu FC (2022–present)
  Biratnagar City FC (2021–present)

Esports
  Revenant Esports (2021–22)
 TEC Gauntlet (2021–22)
 Velocity Gaming (2021–present)

References

External links
 

Athletic shoe brands
Manufacturing companies based in Gurgaon
Indian brands
Manufacturing companies established in 2015
Sporting goods brands
Sporting goods manufacturers of India
Sportswear brands